Namgida Band (Hangul: 남기다밴드) is a South Korean indie folk music group formed in Jeju Island in 2012. The trio is composed of Ryu Jun-young (guitar, lead vocals), Hong Chang-ki (drum, percussion), and Jo Kyung-rae (viola).  the local band performs mainly in Jeju Island.

The group made its debut in 2014 with their digital single "Leaving It Behind in the Road".

Members
 Ryu Jun-young (류준영; born June 28, 1989) - guitar, lead vocals
 Hong Chang-ki (홍창기) - drum, percussion
 Jo Kyung-rae (조경래) - viola

Discography

Digital singles
"Leaving It Behind in the Road" (2014)

"Leaving You Behind" (2014)

References

External links
 

K-pop music groups
Musical groups established in 2012
South Korean musical trios
South Korean folk music
Indie folk groups
2012 establishments in South Korea